Martin Carey is the name of:

Martin Carey (born 1974),  Irish hurler who played as a goalkeeper for the Kilkenny senior team
Martin T. Carey (1922–2020), American businessman and real estate investor